The Border Guard Service Institute of Belarus is the educational institution of the Border Guard Service of Belarus.

History

The school was established on August 19, 1993, when, in accordance with the Resolution of the Council of Ministers of the Republic of Belarus No. 564 the Minsk Higher Military-Political-Arms School faculty was established for border troops. On May 17, 1995, Presidential Decree 192 created the Military Academy of Belarus, which included the faculty of border troops. The first graduation of officers was in 1997. During its existence, the faculty held 13 graduations for about 1,000 border guard officers; 25 students received gold medals and 69 graduated with honors. The institute was established in accordance by decree of the President Alexander Lukashenko on May 5, 2010.  Just four days later, on Victory Day, it made its first national appearance among the parade formations participating in the 2010 Minsk Victory Day Parade on Victors Avenue. From July 1, 2010, the institute began as an independent entity and the successor of the Border Guard Service Institute. It is an independent institution of higher education, forming a single integrated system of training, retraining and advanced training of human resources for the border service.

Artistic Ensemble

Choir
The choir of the Border Guard Service of the Republic of Belarus as well as the whole ensemble work under the umbrella of the institute.

Exemplary Band
The exemplary band is an affiliated musical unit of the Military Band Service of the Armed Forces of the Republic of Belarus. Under the direction of Captain Pavel Pashkin, the band supports ceremonial events and activities at the border service institute. The 30-member until operates as a representation of a typical Belarusian military band, with its repertoire mostly composed of  military songs and marches, alongside hymns, waltzes, jazz, pop music and other musical works.

See also
 Armed Forces of Belarus
 State Border Committee of the Republic of Belarus
 Military Academy of Belarus
 Ministry of the Interior Academy of the Republic of Belarus
 Minsk Suvorov Military School

References

External links 

 – Official YouTube Channel

1993 establishments in Belarus
Education in Minsk
Military academies of Belarus